The Quiricó Formation is a geological formation of the Areado Group in Minas Gerais, Brazil whose strata date back to the Lower Cretaceous (Early Cretaceous). Many occurrences of fossils are reported in the lacustrine deposits of the Quiricó Formation.

Fossil content 
 Neokotus sanfranciscanus
 Tapuiasaurus macedoi
 Dastilbe moraesi
 Laeliichthys ancentralis
 Spectrovenator ragei
Abelisauridae indet.
Carcharodontosauridae indet.
Rebbachisauridae indet.

References

Bibliography 

    
     
  
 
 
 

Geologic formations of Brazil
Lower Cretaceous Series of South America
Cretaceous Brazil
Aptian Stage
Sandstone formations
Shale formations
Lacustrine deposits
Fossiliferous stratigraphic units of South America
Paleontology in Brazil
Formations